Speech and Phenomena: And Other Essays on Husserl's Theory of Signs, or Voice and Phenomenon: Introduction to the Problem of the Sign in Husserl's Phenomenology, is a book about the phenomenology of Edmund Husserl by the French philosopher Jacques Derrida, published in 1967 alongside Derrida's Of Grammatology and Writing and Difference. In Speech and Phenomena, Derrida articulates his mature relationship to Husserl, putting forward an argument concerning Husserl's phenomenological project as a whole in relation to a key distinction in Husserl's theory of language in the Logical Investigations (1900–1901) and how this distinction relates to his description of internal time consciousness. Derrida also develops key discussions of the terms deconstruction and différance. Derrida commented that Speech and Phenomena is the "essay I value the most". Derrida's best known work on Husserl's phenomenology, it is widely considered one of his most important philosophical works.

Background

Speech and Phenomena is the culmination of a long period of study on the phenomenology of Edmund Husserl that Derrida began with his 1953/54 masters thesis The Problem of Genesis in Husserl's Phenomenology. This early thesis then formed the basis for his 1959 paper "'Genesis and Structure' and Phenomenology." Derrida also translated Husserl's "Origin of Geometry" from German into French and published his translation of this article with a book length introduction in 1962.

Structure

Speech and Phenomena consists of an introduction and seven chapters: (1) Sign and Signs, (2) The Reduction of Indication, (3) Meaning as Soliloquy, (4) Meaning and Representation, (5) Signs and the Blink of an Eye, (6) The Voice that Keeps Silence, (7) The Supplement of Origin.

1. Sign and Signs

Derrida identifies his theme in the first chapter as the twofold sense of the word sign for Husserl. Derrida notes that Husserl makes a conceptual distinction in the use of the word sign between expression and indication. For Husserl, Derrida argues, the expression and the indication are both signs but the latter is a sign without meaning or sense. Expression intends towards an ideal meaning and is "tied to the possibility of spoken language."

Translations
Originally translated into English by David B. Allison and published as Speech and Phenomena: And Other Essays on Husserl's Theory of Signs in 1973, a new translation by Leonard Lawlor under the title Voice and Phenomenon: Introduction to the Problem of the Sign in Husserl's Phenomenology was published in 2010.

Commentary

For commentary on Speech and Phenomena see Leonard Lawlor's book Derrida and Husserl (2002) and Joshua Kates's book Essential History (2005).

See also
 Positions

Notes and references

1967 non-fiction books
French non-fiction books
Phenomenology literature
Philosophy books
Presses Universitaires de France books
Works about Edmund Husserl
Works by Jacques Derrida